The 2012–13 Pro12 League (also known as the RaboDirect Pro12 for sponsorship reasons) was the 12th season of the rugby union competition originally known as the Celtic League, the third with its current 12-team format, and the second with RaboDirect as title sponsor.

Ospreys were the defending champions, but they failed to qualify for the end-of-season playoffs.

The twelve teams that competed were the four Irish teams, Munster, Leinster, Connacht and Ulster; two Scottish teams, Edinburgh and Glasgow Warriors; four Welsh teams, Cardiff Blues, Newport Gwent Dragons, Ospreys and Scarlets; and two Italian teams, Benetton Treviso and newly created Zebre.

The title was won by Leinster, defeating Ulster 24–18 in the final.

Changes for the season

Italy
Zebre replaced Aironi Rugby after they had their licence revoked by the Italian Rugby Federation for financial reasons. Roberto Manghi will become their Head coach for their début season.

Scotland
Ahead of this season Glasgow Warriors moved home, leaving their previous home of Firhill in the Maryhill area of the city for the smaller Scotstoun Stadium. They also came into the season with a new head coach, with former Scotland stand-off Gregor Townsend replacing Sean Lineen.

Ireland
New Zealander Rob Penney replaced Tony McGahan as director of rugby at Munster, and fellow New Zealander Mark Anscombe replaced Brian McLaughlin as head coach of Ulster.
In Munster, Paul O'Connell stood down as captain, with Doug Howlett announced as his replacement.

Wales
The Welsh regions saw a number of changes in coaching personnel, as Phil Davies took over the reins at Cardiff Blues, Steve Tandy replaced Sean Holley as Ospreys head coach and former Ireland international Simon Easterby succeeding Nigel Davies at the Scarlets, after he departed to take over at English Premiership side Gloucester. Scarlets also announced that Rob McCusker would replace Matthew Rees as captain.

On 28 August 2012, the Welsh Rugby Union announced a new annual event which will feature all four regions playing in a doubleheader at Millennium Stadium (similar to the long-established London Double Header in the English Premiership). The first of these events took place on 30 March 2013, with an initial contract set to run for four years.

Teams

Table

Fixtures
All times are local.

Round 1

Round 2

Round 3

Round 4

Round 5

Round 6

Round 7

Round 8

Round 4 rescheduled match

This match – originally scheduled to be held during Round 4, on 21 September 2012 – was postponed due to the death of Ulster player Nevin Spence in a farming accident on 15 September.

Round 9

Round 10

Round 11

1872 Cup 1st round

Welsh Round

Round 12

1872 Cup 2nd round

Round 13

Round 14

Round 15

Round 16

Round 17

Round 18

Round 19

Judgement Day

Round 20

Round 21

Round 19 rescheduled match

This match – originally scheduled to be held during Round 19, on 30 March 2013 – was postponed due to a waterlogged pitch.

Round 22

Play-offs

Semi-finals
The semi-finals were played on the weekend of 10/11 May 2013; these followed a 1 v 4, 2 v 3 system with the games being played at the home ground of the higher placed teams.

Final

The final was contested on Saturday, 25 May 2013, between the winners of the two semi-finals.

Leading scorers
Note: Flags to the left of player names indicate national team as has been defined under IRB eligibility rules, or primary nationality for players who have not yet earned international senior caps. Players may hold one or more non-IRB nationalities.

Top points scorers

Top try scorers

End-of-season awards

2012/2013 Dream Team

Notes

References

External links

2012–13 Pro12 at ESPN

 
 
2012-13
2012–13 in Irish rugby union
2012–13 in Welsh rugby union
2012–13 in Scottish rugby union
2012–13 in Italian rugby union